Monte Mariano Church at Farangipet in Mangalore, India, is a church where the Roman Catholic festival Monti Fest was initiated by Joachim Miranda, a Goan Catholic priest at Farangipet in 1763.

History 
The church was built by the Portuguese in 1568 and was then part of the erstwhile South Canara district. It was mentioned by the Italian traveller Pietro Della Valle, who visited Mangalore in 1623, referring to is as the Church of St. Francis of Assisi.

Monte Mariano (Mount of Mary) is the official name for the place. The Monti fest derives its name, from Monte. Fr. Joachim Miranda, started the annual new corn feast. The feast is celebrated every year on 8 September. The statue of Infant Mary in the chapel was brought by a family in Nelyadi-Kerala from Italy. Though Tippu Sultan destroyed the churches of Canara, he spared Monte Mariano Church in deference to the friendship of his father Hyder Ali with Father Miranda. The Church is situated on the banks of River Nethravathi.

Services
There is a regular English Mass at 6 a.m. and Sunday Konkani Mass at 8 a.m.

Notes

Churches in Mangalore Diocese
Roman Catholic churches in Mangalore